"Tócame" is a song by Brazilian singer Anitta, released through Warner Records on July 10, 2020. The track features American singers Arcángel and De La Ghetto.

Background
On June 2, 2020, an Asian website leaked the alleged cover and release date of the single, titled "Tócame", which would be released on June 12. On July 2, Anitta officially released the cover and release date.

Live performances
Anitta performed the song for the first time on July 11, 2020, at the Altas Horas. On August 21, she performed at The Late Late Show with James Corden.

Music video
The music video was directed by Giovanni Bianco, with his scenes being recorded using drones in order to avoid contact between people due to the pandemic of COVID-19. The clip features the participation of the singer's ex-boyfriend, Gui Araújo, anonymous dancing in their apartments and slabs, in addition to the guest artists.

Charts

Certifications and sales

References

Anitta (singer) songs
Arcángel (singer) songs
Songs written by Anitta (singer)
Songs written by Ryan Tedder
Song recordings produced by Ryan Tedder
2020 singles
Warner Records singles
2020 songs
Songs written by Andrés Torres (producer)
Song recordings produced by Andrés Torres (producer)
Songs written by Mauricio Rengifo